Raimbaut II, Count of Orange (in Latin Raimboldus comes de Oringis) was the elder son of  and of his first wife Gilberte.

Biography 
Raimbaut's date of birth is not known (possibly around 1066 in Orange). According to two sources, Albert of Aix and William of Tyre (neither of them eyewitnesses), he joined the First Crusade in the army of Raymond of Saint-Gilles, presumably setting out in 1096; his name is linked with those of Adhemar of Le Puy and Robert II of Flanders, and he is said to have been present at the siege of Antioch in 1098. He remained in Palestine and died there, probably in 1121.

He married, but his wife's name is not known. No sons survived him. His daughter, Tiburge, Countess of Orange, in her father's prolonged absence, was being named "countess of Orange" as early as 1115. She married William of Aumelas, second son of William VI of Montpellier; she was still alive in 1136. Their son (Raimbaut's only grandson) was the troubadour Raimbaut of Orange, and he inherited the territories of Aumelas and Orange.

A statue of Raimbaut, count of Orange, was erected in the main square at Orange in 1846.

11th-century births
1121 deaths
People from Orange, Vaucluse
Counts of Orange
Christians of the First Crusade